Tsugumasa is a masculine Japanese given name.

Possible writings
Tsugumasa can be written using different combinations of kanji characters. Here are some examples:

次正, "next, righteous"
次雅, "next, elegant"
次昌, "next, clear"
次政, "next, politics"
次将, "next, commander"
次真, "next, reality"
嗣正, "succession, righteous"
嗣雅, "succession, elegant"
嗣昌, "succession, clear"
嗣政, "succession, politics"
嗣将, "succession, commander"
嗣真, "succession, reality"
継正, "continue, righteous"
継雅, "continue, elegant"
継昌, "continue, clear"
継政, "continue, politics"
継将, "continue, commander"
継真, "continue, reality"

The name can also be written in hiragana つぐまさ or katakana ツグマサ.

Notable people with the name
, Japanese daimyō.
, Ryukyuan politician.
, Japanese politician.

Japanese masculine given names